Gajvan (also Romanized as Gajvān and Kajvān) is a village in Darzab Rural District, in the Central District of Mashhad County, Razavi Khorasan Province, Iran. At the 2006 census, its population was 959, in 238 families.

References 

Populated places in Mashhad County